The dotted wrasse, or Cirrhilabrus punctatus, is a species of wrasse native to the western Pacific Ocean, where it occurs from Papua New Guinea and Australia to Tonga and Fiji. This species is found in the aquarium trade.

References

External links
 

punctatus
Taxa named by John Ernest Randall
Taxa named by Rudie Hermann Kuiter
Fish described in 1989